Domingo Rey d'Harcourt (1883 – February 7, 1939) was a Nationalist commander during the Spanish Civil War.

He had risen to Colonel of artillery, and joined the military rising against the Republican Government that became the Spanish Civil War.

During the Civil War Rey d'Harcourt was the commander of the Nationalist garrison of the city of Teruel during the Battle of Teruel. Heavily outnumbered, Rey d'Harcourt made a last stand in four key points of the city; the Civil Governor's Building, the Bank of Spain, the Convent of Santa Clara and the Seminary.  Republican Radio Barcelona announced that Teruel had fallen, but Rey d'Harcourt and the remnants of the 4,000 man garrison still held out. With no water, few medical supplies and little food he was finally forced to surrender on January 8, 1938.

Despite his heroism, his surrender was criticized by many in the Nationalist high command.

He was jailed for treason against the Republic first in Valencia and then in Barcelona. During the Nationalist Catalonia Offensive he was taken towards the French border and was killed by his guards along with forty-two other prisoners of the Battle of Teruel, including Anselmo Polanco, Bishop of Teruel.

References

1883 births
1939 deaths
People from the Province of Teruel
Spanish generals
Spanish military personnel of the Spanish Civil War (National faction)
Executed military personnel
People killed by the Second Spanish Republic
People executed by Spain by firearm
Executed Spanish people